Thomas Harman Brenchley (1822 – 19 September 1894) was an English wine merchant and distiller, and a cricketer. He played first-class cricket for Kent County Cricket Club and for the Gentlemen of Kent amateur team between 1848 and 1851. 

He was the eldest son of John Brenchley of Wombwell Hall, Northfleet parish, Kent, and his wife Mary Rachel Harman. His birth date is not known, but he was christened at Milton-next-Gravesend in Kent on 7 May 1822. Brenchley died at Glaneirw near Tan-y-groes in Cardiganshire, Wales in 1894.

Brenchley played in 11 first-class matches, scoring a total of 115 runs. He played a number of other matches for the Gentlemen of Kent as well as for Gravesend Cricket Club, His brother Henry played in three first-class matches for Kent between 1854 and 1857.

References

External links
 

1822 births
1894 deaths
English cricketers
Kent cricketers
Gentlemen of Kent cricketers
People from Milton, Kent